U.S. Route 36 (US-36) is a major east–west route in the U.S. state of Kansas, extending from the Colorado state line to the Missouri border.

Route description
The highway enters from Colorado into Cheyenne County, and shares a seven-mile (11 km) concurrency through the town of St. Francis with K-27, the first north–south route intersected in Kansas. K-27 splits east of St. Francis and heads south toward Goodland, and US-36 then continues through Bird City and McDonald before intersecting K-25 in Atwood, the seat of Rawlins County.

US-36 continues east through Decatur County, intersecting with US-83 in Oberlin before beginning a concurrency with K-383 in Norton County, a concurrency which runs for 12 miles (19 km) through the city of Norton, where it crosses US-283. K-383 splits in eastern Norton County and bends northeast toward Almena and the Nebraska state line, while US-36 enters Phillips County, picking up a brief concurrency with US-183 in Phillipsburg.

The highway passes through the small towns of Agra and Kensington before reaching Smith Center, the seat of Smith County, where US-281 joins US-36 for a 12-mile (19 km) concurrency. Near Lebanon, US-36 passes about four miles (6.4 km) south of the Geographic center of the contiguous United States, which is indicated by a marker where US-281 splits northward to Lebanon. US-36 then passes through largely unpopulated areas, except for the tiny town of Mankato in Jewell County.

At Belleville, the seat of Republic County, US-36 has an interchange with US-81. After passing through Washington County, US-36 picks up a brief concurrency with US-77 in Marysville, the seat of Marshall County, and another one with US-75 in Fairview. Between the junctions with US-77 and US-75, the highway passes through Nemaha County and its seat, Seneca.

In Brown County, US-36 becomes a super two, intersecting the concurrency of US-73 and US-159 in Hiawatha. The highway becomes full-access again before entering Doniphan County for its final trek through the state, passing through Troy and into Wathena, where it picks up freeway status though Elwood before crossing the Missouri River on the Pony Express Bridges and entering Missouri.

History
Prior to 1926, the portion of future US-36 between Norton and the Missouri state line was known as the Rock Island Highway. The US-36 designation first appeared on Kansas maps in 1932. Since then, the highway has been straightened and parts of it upgraded to freeway or super two status.

Originally US-36 overlapped K-63 for a mile north out of Seneca, then turned east and left K-63 towards Oneida. Then in a March 21, 1939 resolution, it was approved to realign US-36 between Seneca and Fairview on a straight alignment, eliminating the overlap with K-63.

Major junctions

References

External links

Kansas Department of Transportation State Map
KDOT: Historic State Maps

Transportation in Cheyenne County, Kansas
Transportation in Rawlins County, Kansas
Transportation in Decatur County, Kansas
Transportation in Norton County, Kansas
Transportation in Phillips County, Kansas
Transportation in Smith  County, Kansas
Transportation in Jewell County, Kansas
Transportation in Republic County, Kansas
Transportation in Washington County, Kansas
Transportation in Marshall County, Kansas
Transportation in Nemaha County, Kansas
Transportation in Brown County, Kansas
Transportation in Doniphan County, Kansas
 Kansas
36